Sheikh Rashid bin Saeed Al Maktoum (11 June 1912 – 7 October 1990) was the vice president and second prime minister of the United Arab Emirates and ruler of Dubai. He ruled Dubai for 32 years from 1958 until his death in 1990.

Development of Dubai
Sheikh Rashid was responsible for the transformation of Dubai from a small cluster of settlements near the Dubai Creek to a modern port city and commercial hub. 

A quote commonly attributed to Sheikh Rashid reflected his concern that Dubai's oil, which was discovered in 1966 and which began production in 1969, would run out within a few generations.

"My grandfather rode a camel, my father rode a camel, I drive a Mercedes, my son drives a Land Rover, his son will drive a Land Rover, but his son will ride a camel",

He therefore worked to develop the economy of Dubai so that it could survive after the end of oil production, and was a driving force behind a number of major infrastructure projects to promote Dubai as a regional hub for trade, such as:

Port Rashid (opened in 1972)
Al Shindagha Tunnel (opened in 1975)
Jebel Ali Port (opened in 1979)
Dubai World Trade Centre (built in 1978)
The second major dredging and widening of the Dubai Creek (early 1970s)
Dubai Drydocks (opened in 1983)

Relationship with other emirates 
There had been an armed border dispute between Dubai and Abu Dhabi in 1946, and when Sheikh Rashid became ruler of Dubai, there was still a state of stand-off between the two emirates. Sheikh Rashid's accession did not serve to improve the situation because of a delicate family relationship. The ruling emir of Abu Dhabi, Shakhbut, was a first cousin of Sheikh Rashid's only wife, Latifah. Their fathers had been brothers. However, Shakhbut's father had killed Latifah's father and seized the throne of Abu Dhabi in 1922, causing Latifah's family to flee to Dubai where, many years later, the two families arranged for Sheikh Rashid to marry the refugee princess. Given this history, there was little love lost between the cousins and relations between the two emirates did not improve until much later. 

Instead, Sheikh Rashid established a close relationship with Qatar, who was a rival of Abu Dhabi on the other (western) border. Sheikh Rashid's daughter married the new emir of Qatar in 1961 and a warm relationship was established. Thus, when India devalued the Gulf Rupee in 1966, both Qatar and Dubai adopted the Qatar-Dubai Riyal as a common currency, whereas Abu Dhabi adopted the Bahraini dinar. 

Sheikh Rashid also established close relations with Kuwait and other royal families of the region. The Emir of Kuwait assisted in the financing of the dredging of Dubai creek. Dubai also raised funds for the dredging by issuing bonds, known as the 'creek bonds,' which proved popular with investors. Revenue derived from land reclamation made possible by the dredging proved crucial for funding Dubai's future growth. The dredging and land reclamation project, regarded at first as a folly, resulted in Dubai's rising prominence as an entrepôt, a position cemented by the visionary construction of a 15-berth deep-water port, Port Rashid, starting in 1969.

Despite the rather fraught relationship between the two emirates, Sheikh Rashid brought Dubai to join Abu Dhabi and other northern emirates to create the United Arab Emirates in 1971. In 1973, Dubai joined the other emirates to adopt a uniform currency, the UAE dirham.

Jebel Ali port was established in 1979, and the customs free zone Jebel Ali Free Zone (JAFZ) was built around the port in 1985. By the late 1990s, JAFZ developed into a commercial free zone.

Family
Sheikh Rashid's father was Sheikh Saeed bin Maktoum Al Maktoum, while his mother was Sheikha Hessa bint Al Mur bin Hureiz Al Falasi.

Sheikh Rashid Al Maktoum married only once. His wife, Sheikha Latifa bint Hamdan Al Nahyan, is the daughter of Sheikh Hamdan bin Zayed Al Nahyan, who had ruled Abu Dhabi for 10 years (1912-22). After her father was murdered by family members, Sheikha Latifa (along with other family members) had fled Abu Dhabi and taken refuge in Dubai. Many years later, the penniless refugee lady was married to Rashid in a match arranged by their families. Rashid and Latifa were blessed with nine children, being four sons and five daughters:

 Maktoum bin Rashid Al Maktoum (1943–2006), who succeeded his father as ruler of Dubai (ruled 1990-2006)
 Hamdan bin Rashid Al Maktoum (1945–2021)
 Mohammed bin Rashid Al Maktoum (born 1949), who succeeded his elder brother as ruler of Dubai (ruling 2006-)
 Ahmed bin Rashid Al Maktoum (born 1956)
 Maryam bint Rashid Al Maktoum married to the first Qatari emir, Ahmad bin Ali Al Thani, who was deposed in 1972 by a cousin.
 Fatima bint Rashid Al Maktoum. 
 Hassa bint Rashid Al Maktoum married to Ahmad bin Maktoum bin Juma Al Maktoum. Their children are Latifa bint Ahmed Al Maktoum and Rashid.
 Maitha bint Rashid Al Maktoum.
 Shaikha bint Rashid Al Maktoum married to the Saudi Prince Abdulaziz bin Saud bin Mohammed Al Saud, known as Al Samer, a very famous poet. They have 3 sons: Rashid (born 1996), Saud, and Mohammed.

Both his predecessor and successor as Prime Minister of the UAE was his son, Sheikh Maktoum bin Rashid Al Maktoum. Sheikh Maktoum bin Rashid was the prime minister of United Arab Emirates from 1971 to 1979, and acceded as ruler of Dubai on his father's death on 7 October 1990, until his death on 4 January 2006. Following Maktoum's death in 2006, another of Sheikh Rashid's sons, Mohammed bin Rashid Al Maktoum, acceded to these positions and is the current vice president and prime minister of the UAE and the ruler of Dubai.

Sheikh Rashid was half-brother—46 years older—to Sheikh Ahmed bin Saeed Al Maktoum, presently the Chairman of Emirates Airline.

See also
 Hazza bin Sultan Al Nahyan, friend and relative by marriage
 Timeline of Dubai

Notes

References

External links
Shaikh Mohammad: A role model for world leaders

1912 births
1990 deaths
Rashid bin Saeed Al Maktoum
Prime Ministers of the United Arab Emirates
Rulers of Dubai
20th-century Emirati people